Leptolinea tardivitalis is a mesophilic, non-spore-forming, non-motile, Gram-negative, filamentous bacteria with type strain YMTK-2T (=JCM 12579T =DSM 16556T), the type species of its genus.

References

Further reading
Beatty, Tom J. Genome Evolution of Photosynthetic Bacteria. Vol. 66. Academic Press, 2013.
Tewari, Vinod, Vinod C. Tewari, and Joseph Seckbach, eds.STROMATOLITES: Interaction of Microbes with Sediments: Interaction of Microbes with Sediments. Vol. 18. Springer, 2011.
Dilek, Yıldırım. Links Between Geological Processes, Microbial Activities & Evolution of Life: Microbes and Geology. Eds. Yildirim Dilek, H. Furnes, and Karlis Muehlenbachs. Vol. 4. Springer, 2008.

External links

LPSN
WORMS
Type strain of Leptolinea tardivitalis at BacDive -  the Bacterial Diversity Metadatabase

Bacteria described in 2006
Chloroflexota